The Gribushin Family ( is a 1923 Soviet silent drama film directed by Aleksandr Razumny.

Plot 
Between the manufacturer Gribushin and student Maxim, the tutor of his son, schoolboy George, a clash occurs. Gribushin fires Maxim from the position of tutor. The October Revolution forces the manufacturer to flee abroad, and his children, Sonia and George, are sent to work in the Volga region. On the day of the fifth anniversary of the October Revolution Gribushin returns to the USSR for his jewels ...

References

Bibliography 
 Christie, Ian & Taylor, Richard. The Film Factory: Russian and Soviet Cinema in Documents 1896-1939. Routledge, 2012.

External links 
 

1923 films
Soviet silent films
1920s Russian-language films
Films directed by Aleksandr Razumnyj
Soviet black-and-white films
Soviet drama films
1923 drama films
Silent drama films